Marco van der Hulst (born 20 May 1963) is a Dutch cyclist. He competed in the men's team pursuit event at the 1984 Summer Olympics, finishing in tenth place.

See also
 List of Dutch Olympic cyclists

References

1963 births
Living people
Dutch male cyclists
Olympic cyclists of the Netherlands
Cyclists at the 1984 Summer Olympics
Sportspeople from Haarlem
Cyclists from North Holland